12 Memories is the fourth studio album from Scottish alternative rock band Travis. The album was released on 11 October 2003 on Epic Records. In comparison, the album is a much more mature and lyrically darker album, focusing on issues such as the 2003 Iraq invasion, politicians, psychological crisis and domestic abuse.

Background and recording
Travis drummer Neil Primrose suffered a severe spinal injury in a swimming pool accident in July 2002. The band were forced to take six months off during his recuperation before regrouping. Moving into a cottage on the island of Mull they set up a small studio, and over two weeks, came up with nine new songs that would form the basis of 12 Memories.

Musically, 12 Memories has embraced use of distorted guitars and a more electronic, rockier and even trip hop style. Three singles were released from the album - "Re-Offender", a track that deals with domestic abuse, "The Beautiful Occupation", a song which was inspired by the invasion of Iraq by US and coalition forces in 2003, and "Love Will Come Through", a more traditional Travis song, which was later featured in a marketing campaign by the Post Office. Whilst being titled 12 Memories, there are only eleven tracks on the album, each one of these a "memory." The "12th memory" is actually "Some Sad Song", a hidden track following the last track that criticises the Catholic school system, in which vocalist and songwriter Fran Healy was educated. The album cover is somewhat similar to those of The Beatles's Let It Be (1970) and U2's Pop (1997).

This is the only Travis album without their logo on the album cover. However, their logo can be seen from the album cover, as the visible part of the rear back cover, the Travis logo can be found. The rear back cover is also similar to the cover of "Re-Offender", the lead single. As the album does not display the title on the cover either, a sticker is featured on the case which says the title of the album. Also, a Parental Guidance logo is featured as a sticker on the case.

Release and reception
12 Memories entered the UK charts at #3, with lead single "Re-Offender" scoring the band their fifth Top Ten UK hit at #7. Charting at #48, "The Beautiful Occupation" was their first single to miss the Top 40, although the following single, fan favourite "Love Will Come Through", fared slightly better, charting at #28. Produced by Travis themselves, Tchad Blake, and Steve Orchard, the album marked a move into more organic, moody and political territory for the band. Although this seems to have alienated some fans, the album generally received very positive reviews (for example, "Then, of course, there's Travis and their album 12 Memories [Epic]. You just have to sit there and listen to it all the way through, and it will take you on a real journey. It's like an old album. It's like the Beatles' Revolver [1966]. Fran Healy's voice and lyrics are mesmerizing and beautiful" — Elton John). The album received positive reviews from music critics. At Metacritic, which assigns a normalised rating out of 100 to reviews from mainstream critics, the album received an average score of 64 based on 22 reviews, which indicates "generally favorable reviews."

Yet 12 Memories also saw the band lose ground in the US, where Coldplay had usurped Travis during their 2002 absence. Much later, Healy spoke about the album as a whole being about him working through his own clinical depression, and the twelve memories being twelve reasons for him reaching his depressed state. At the time this wasn't mentioned, but the revelation that Healy was depressed ties in with the band's decision to take longer writing and releasing their next work.

Track listing

Personnel
 Fran Healy – vocals, guitar, piano
 Andy Dunlop – guitar, banjo, backing vocals
 Dougie Payne – bass guitar, backing vocals
 Neil Primrose – drums

Charts

Weekly charts

Year-end charts

References

2003 albums
Travis (band) albums
Epic Records albums
Independiente Records albums
Albums produced by Tchad Blake
Albums recorded in a home studio